Beyoncé (often stylized in all caps) is the fifth studio album by American singer Beyoncé. It was released in the early hours of December 13, 2013, through Parkwood Entertainment and Columbia Records as a complete surprise. Developed as a visual album, every song is accompanied by a non-linear short film that illustrates the musical concepts conceived during production. Beyoncé's desire to assert her full artistic freedom served as inspiration for the album's dark, personal subject matter, which incorporated feminist themes of sex, monogamy, beauty standards, relationship problems and criticism of capitalism. It was released on a Friday, which defied the Tuesday release that was standard at the time. Beyoncé and its release is frequently credited with inventing the modern definition of the visual album, popularizing the surprise album release strategy, and provoking the International Federation of the Phonographic Industry to change the day of the week when music is released worldwide from Tuesday to Friday.

The album's initial recording began in New York City, where Beyoncé invited producers and songwriters to live with her for a month. During extensive touring the following year, the album changed as she conceived of creating a visual accompaniment to its songs and resumed recording sessions with electronic producer and rock musician Boots. Their collaboration led to more sonically experimental material, which combined contemporary R&B with electronic and soul music. Throughout this period, the album's songs and videos were composed in strict secrecy as Beyoncé devised an unexpected release.

Beyoncé was released digitally on the iTunes Store without prior announcement or promotion, and debuted at number one on the US Billboard 200, earning Beyoncé her fifth consecutive number-one album on the chart. The album sold over 617,000 copies in the United States and 828,773 copies worldwide in its first three days of sales, becoming the fastest-selling album in the history of the iTunes Store up to that point. According to the International Federation of the Phonographic Industry (IFPI), Beyoncé was globally the tenth-best-selling album of 2013. The album was reissued in November 2014 as part of a platinum edition, along with an extended play of new songs, and has sold over 5 million copies worldwide. Part of the album was promoted on The Mrs. Carter Show World Tour during the 2014 legs.

Beyoncé received widespread acclaim from critics upon release who praised its production, exploration of sexuality, vocal performance, as well as the album's surprise release strategy which was subsequently replicated by many artists. In 2020, Beyoncé was ranked 81st in Rolling Stone's 500 Greatest Albums of All Time list.

Background and development 
Following the release of her fourth studio album 4 (2011), Beyoncé gave birth to her first child, Blue Ivy on January 7, 2012. Just four months after labor, she pursued a three-night residency at Revel Atlantic City's Ovation Hall, entitled Revel Presents: Beyoncé Live. The choice to hold concerts so soon was purposeful; Beyoncé intended to demonstrate to mothers that they need not halt their careers despite having had children. Most of the summer following the residency was spent in The Hamptons, New York, where she took time out from the public to spend time with her daughter and to begin sessions for her next album. She resumed work in early 2013, performing "The Star-Spangled Banner" at President Barack Obama's second inauguration and headlining the Super Bowl XLVII halftime show, where there were expectations she would debut new music, although these rumors never materialized. She also released a self-directed autobiographical documentary in February, entitled Life Is But a Dream.

In March 2013, a two-part hip hop track entitled "Bow Down/I Been On" was released onto Beyoncé's SoundCloud account. "Bow Down", produced by Hit-Boy, was written after Beyoncé woke up one morning with a chant stuck in her head, feeling angry and defensive. This was melded with a Timbaland-produced second half "I Been On" that makes prominent use of a pitch-distorted vocal as a homage to the Houston hip hop scene. Michael Cragg of The Guardian described the song as "brilliantly odd", commending its loud, abrasive production, while Pitchforks Lindsay Zoladz noted the song's assertiveness and believed it served as an introduction of what was to come. "Bow Down/I Been On" was perceived as a significant departure from Beyoncé's existing catalogue, particularly for its aggressive nature. The song's atmosphere and its controversial "Bow down, bitches" refrain drew a mixed reaction from those who questioned whether the lyric was aimed at women or merely a moment of braggadocio. Beyoncé clarified after the album's release, where elements of "Bow Down" appear on the track "Flawless", that the song and its refrain were intended as a statement of female empowerment.

Neither Beyoncé or her representatives commented on the release of "Bow Down/I Been On", and many journalists questioned the nature of its release in the context of the release of her upcoming album. Further confusion was created when portions of other tracks "Grown Woman" and "Standing on the Sun" were used for television advertising campaigns, with a similar lack of explanation as to their purpose. Through much of 2013, the media intermittently reported that the album was delayed or scrapped, with one story alleging Beyoncé had scrapped fifty songs in favor of starting again. In July 2013, a spokesperson for Beyoncé denied speculation that her album had been delayed, stating there was no official release date to begin with and that when a date is set, it would be announced via an official press release. There was considerable confusion among music journalists and fans as Beyoncé engaged in extensive touring, while not discussing the album or its release.

Recording and production 
Recording sessions began in the summer of 2012 in the Hamptons, New York, where Beyoncé and her husband Jay-Z were living. She invited producers and songwriters to accompany them, including Sia, Timbaland, Justin Timberlake and The-Dream. Beyoncé described the atmosphere as unconventional, saying, "we had dinners with the producers every day, like a family ... it was like a camp. Weekends off. You could go and jump in the pool and ride bikes ... the ocean and grass and sunshine ... it was really a safe place." She would spend the majority of her day with her newborn daughter, taking some hours out to record music. The album's opening track "Pretty Hurts", co-written by Sia, was completed during these sessions. The project was suspended until 2013 and relocated to Jungle City and Oven Studios in New York City, where most of the album was recorded. In an interview for Vogue in January 2013, Jason Gay described Beyoncé's attention to detail as "obsessive" when observing her studio, noting the vision boards she created for inspiration, which contained potential song titles, old album covers and pictures of performances.

In mid-2013, a relatively unknown artist Boots, signed a publishing deal with Jay-Z's Roc Nation. In an interview for Pitchfork after the album's release, Boots was coy when answering questions about how Beyoncé discovered his demo or of his work previous to the project, only confirming his signing. In June 2013, they met in person for the first time and Boots presented Beyoncé with material he felt would resonate with her. However, Beyoncé was more interested in his experimental material, and he reluctantly played her his song "Haunted" on his cellphone. She refused to ignore its potential. At a later meeting, he played her a stream of consciousness rap called "Ghost", which he wrote after an exasperating meeting with a potential record label. Boots began by composing a melody that reminded him of a hypnotic state, then layering guitar arpeggios to resemble the work of English electronic musician Aphex Twin. Subsequently, "Ghost" became the first half of "Haunted"; he later described Beyoncé as the "only visionary in the room" for her ability to find potential in scraps of songs. Following these sessions, Boots would go on to work on eighty percent of Beyoncé.

While recording in New York City, the previously released "Bow Down" was incorporated into a track that became "Flawless". During its composition, Beyoncé chose to interpolate a portion of Chimamanda Ngozi Adichie's TED talk "We Should All Be Feminists" into it as she identified with her interpretations of feminism. Organic approaches were taken when writing and recording "Drunk in Love" and "Partition". When working with Detail and Timbaland on a beat that became "Drunk in Love", she was inspired by what she described as pure enjoyment, as both she and Jay-Z free-styled their verses for the track in the studio. Similarly, the bassline of "Partition", which Beyoncé found reminiscent of hip hop music during her early romance with Jay-Z, influenced her to accompany the track with sexual lyrics. She took to a microphone without pen and paper and rapped the first verse, finding herself initially embarrassed by the explicitness of the lyrics. When composing "Partition", a rap known as "Yoncé" was used as the opening of the track, the beat of which was built by Justin Timberlake banging on buckets in the studio.

Only four songs were not recorded entirely in New York studios: "Superpower" and "Heaven", which were partially recorded in California, as well as "No Angel" which was composed in London and "XO" in Berlin and Sydney. Although the demo of "XO" was recorded when Beyoncé had contracted a sinus infection, the vocals were never re-recorded as she felt their imperfections fit more appropriately. In October, the album began taking shape and "Standing on the Sun" and "Grown Woman" were removed—songs which had been previewed in 2013 on television advertisements—from Beyoncé to fit in with its minimalist approach. During Thanksgiving week, the vocals on the album were edited and producers were notified to submit their final cuts. Beyoncé spent less time on vocal production than she had done with her previous projects, instead focusing on perfecting the album's music. Beyoncé was mastered at Sterling Sound in New York City. In total, eighty songs were recorded for the album.

Visuals 

Beyoncé first considered the idea of creating a "visual album" in June 2013, when only three or four songs had been completed. Explaining her motivation, she said she would often connect images, childhood memories, emotions and fantasies to songs she was in the midst of composing, and that she "wanted people to hear the songs with the story that's in my head as that's what makes it mine". She highlighted the immersive experience of Michael Jackson's Thriller (1982) as the principal influence for creating a body of work that "people would hear things differently and ... actually be able to see the whole vision of the album".

The videos were filmed between June and November 2013 in various countries as the singer traveled on her world tour. Todd Tourso, who directed the videos for "Jealous" and "Heaven", served as the creative director for the entire project. Much of his role concerned liaising between Beyoncé, who for most videos already had concepts, and the respective directors who also had propositions. As most videos were shot outside of the US, the crew surrounding the videos was small, consisting only of Tourso, the director of photography and producer, as well as Beyoncé and her stylist, make-up artist and security. When filming in public, Beyoncé would wear in-ear headphones instead of having the music played out loud, in order to maintain the secrecy of the project and prevent any songs leaking. By the time of post-production, the songwriting process began to converge with the content of the visuals and Beyoncé would watch unedited footage to fit the music to them. "Flawless", "Rocket" and "Mine" were noted as having been changed by their visual counterparts, Tourso commenting that "she would rewrite some lines, or she would add certain audio, or she would add bridges" and believed that "it would complete the picture of where the audio needed to go".

Several videos were intended to demonstrate the album's central theme of "finding the beauty in imperfection". While working on "Flawless", Beyoncé was reminded of her loss on television competition Star Search as a child, which she saw as a defining moment in her career, and believed that the competition had taught her how to embrace imperfection in the future. The theme was represented in the videos by the recurring use of trophies, which the singer saw as referencing "all of the sacrifice I have made as a kid, all of the time that I lost". It was also carried into how the visuals were created, with the videos for "Drunk in Love", "Yoncé", "No Angel", "XO" and "Blue" shot without prior preparation, as the singer found enjoyment in the spontaneity of the filming locations and in resisting the urge to perfect them. Noting some of the visuals' explicit content and exposure of her body, Beyoncé said she found shooting them liberating and expressed her intention to demonstrate sexuality as a power that women should have, and not lose after becoming a mother. She went on to say, "I know finding my sensuality, getting back into my body, being proud of growing up, it was important to me that I expressed that ... I know that there are so many women who feel the same way".

Music and lyrics 
Beyoncé is a fourteen track set with seventeen short films: a video for each audio track, two extra videos to accompany the two-part tracks "Haunted" and "Partition", as well as a bonus video for "Grown Woman", which lacks an equivalent audio counterpart. Departing from the traditional R&B leanings of its predecessor, 4 (2011), Beyoncés songs are predominantly alternative R&B. Hence, musically, the album may be located in the post-dubstep era, fusing electronic music with R&B and soul. The album's dark, moody production is more textured than previous releases and songs are characterized by heavy bass and loud hi-hats, as well as prominent synthesizers. A quality of restraint features among most songs "with subdued pulses, ambient effects and throbbing grooves that sneak up on you, threatening to explode but only occasionally transforming".

The album adopts unconventional song structure and as Evan Rytlewski of The A.V. Club notes, many songs "[emphasize] moody, shifting beats and drawn-out vibe sessions" and are left to slowly unfurl. This is particularly prominent on "Haunted" and "Partition" which function as two-part suites. The dream-like state created on "Haunted" is ushered in with a stream of consciousness rap entitled "Ghost" which transitions from "smoky ethereality to off-kilter club beat", amid a shifting bassline and ghostly keyboards. "Partition" begins with "Yoncé", a slick rap set over a simple Middle Eastern rhythm. The song is divided by a brief interlude of camera clicks and the whirring of a car window, before launching into a second-half that melds synthesizer pulses with finger snaps to create a Southern hip hop bassline. Over this, the song follows a candid narrative that describes sex in the back of a limousine when travelling to a nightclub.

Several critics noted the album's extensive exploration of sexuality. Having been a singer since the age of nine, Beyoncé felt "stifled" by the perception she was a role model for young children, and now into her thirties, believed she had "earned the right to ... express any and every side of [her]self". Addressing the album's sexual content specifically, Beyoncé said: "I don't at all have any shame about being sexual and I'm not embarrassed about it and I don't feel like I have to protect that side of me." Several critics described Beyoncés sex songs as a celebration of monogamous love. "Drunk in Love" is a duet with her husband Jay-Z, and features lyrics heavily laden with double entendres that explore lust within their sexual relationship. It fuses intermittent trap beats with heavy bass, skittering synthesizers and drums, and Arabic-scale vocal arpeggios. Beyoncé's vocals are diverse, including a melodramatic chorus sung in her upper register and a half-rapped second verse. "Blow" veers from a thumping jazz beat created with sparse piano chords and guitars to a "swinging electro-funk groove" with elements of neo-disco. Its erotic, tongue-in-cheek lyrics include a running cunnilingus metaphor of "licking Skittles" in its chorus. The slow-jam "Rocket" is a homage to D'Angelo's soul-infused "Untitled (How Does It Feel)" (2000). Described by Entertainment Weeklys Nick Catucci as a "slippery, six-and-a-half-minute funk excursion", Beyoncé adopts a slow, harmonious vocal as she instructs her love interest to watch her perform a striptease.

Much like her previous albums, the record is feminist, with greater exploration of gender issues and conflated with "an unwavering look at black female sexual agency". Soraya McDonald of The Washington Post viewed Beyoncé as significant to black feminism as it celebrates black female sexuality in mainstream music and in the context of hip hop, where it is typically only shown through the male perspective. The album's most explicit commentary on gender is the three-part "Flawless". It opens with the earlier released "Bow Down", before seguing into an excerpt of a speech by Chimamanda Ngozi Adichie on the socialization of girls. The final part uses a staccato, trap beat as Beyoncé reflects on her own feminist attitudes, encouraging self-acceptance among women and criticizing misogynist sentiments.

Other songs allude to darker themes of fear and personal insecurities. Beyoncé noted that the album displayed "sides of [her] that only a few people had seen", adding that "all of us want happiness ... sometimes you have to take the insecurities to get to the secure place. And all of those things I feel happy to express". Caitlin White of The 405 believed the songs as "hold forth on the most important issues in a woman's life by delving into [the singer's] personal experience with them". "Jealous" addresses fidelity and features lyrics in which the protagonist experiences "promises, suspicion and potential revenge". It contains an "uncanny mix of tones and styles", most prominently a morose bassline replete with electronic yelps. "Mine", a futuristic R&B song with jazz elements, is self-reflective, with lyrics that reference marital strife and difficulties with postnatal depression. The neo soul song "Pretty Hurts" is a self-empowerment anthem that decries society's obsession with harmful and unattainable standards of beauty. The song uses audio snippets of beauty pageants which Beyoncé contested in to frame the song in the context of her childhood.

Beyoncés vocal production is diverse; several songs are half-rapped and half-sung with particular use of falsetto and head voice. The Telegraphs Neil McCormick notes that while the singer uses her expansive vocal range, unlike her previous releases, she restrains from belting and vocal runs as to increase tension in the music. "No Angel", a chillwave song with influences of minimalist hip hop music, is noted for its use of the falsetto vocal register, with a delivery that is "threatening to fray". The doo wop-inspired duet with Frank Ocean "Superpower" is sung in the lower register of both singers, while employing girl group harmonies similar to Beyoncé's work in Destiny's Child. The love song "XO" uses several vocal techniques to evoke a celebration of love and life, including echo and several hooks. Its ascending chorus lines use call and response, as well as backing vocals of a sing-along crowd, as Beyoncé sings of how her "darkest nights" are enlightened by her lover's face. The album's closing tracks are midtempo ballads "Heaven" and "Blue". "Heaven" is an emotive, piano-led hymn with gospel elements, while "Blue" is built on a piano melody over which Beyoncé sings of the love for her daughter, using her full vocal range.

Artwork, release and promotion 

Throughout 2013, Beyoncé worked on the project in strict secrecy, sharing details of the album with a small circle of people and continually shifting the deadline, which was only finalized a week before its release. She later explained that her intent was to reinstate the idea of an album release as a significant, exciting event that had lost meaning in the face of hype created around singles.

Tourso and his small team of designers were tasked with designing Beyoncés album cover, which he found difficult considering it was a visual album and thus "inundated with imagery". Over three months he considered over a hundred options, only to proceed with his very first idea. He was inspired by the cover of Metallica's eponymous fifth studio album (1991) to create a bold statement, specifically to deviate from a "beauty shot" of Beyoncé which he felt would be expected. They used a font similar to placards used in boxing matches to represent abrasive masculinity, which was contrasted by the greyish-pink font which they described as "a subversion of femininity".

In early December 2013, Beyoncé and her management company Parkwood Entertainment held meetings concerning its release with executives from Columbia Records and the iTunes Store, using the code name "Lily" for the album. Meetings were also held with Facebook executives in regard to advertising that resulted in the album benefiting from the social network's then new "Auto Play" feature for videos. On December 9, 2013, Rob Stringer, Chairman of Columbia Records, knowingly told media that the album would be released at some point in 2014 and it would be "monumental". On December 13, 2013, the album was released in the early hours of the morning without any prior announcement or promotion exclusively on the iTunes Store. The singer commented that she was "bored" of her music being marketed as it had been done previously, and wanted its release to be a different experience for her fans. The album was available exclusively on iTunes Stores until December 20, 2013, when physical copies were distributed to other retailers. Parkwood Entertainment had a seventy-two-hour turnaround from the moment the album was released online to prepare its physical release.

As soon as the album became exclusively available to iTunes Stores, Sony Music handed down an edict that forbade retailers to put the album up for pre-order, as to further protect the exclusivity with the iTunes Store. It was then reported that American retailers Target and Amazon Music refused to sell the physical copies of the album. According to a Target spokesperson, the store was only interested in retailing albums that were released digitally and physically simultaneously. On December 21, 2013, all the videos from the album were screened at the SVA Theater in New York City.

After the album's release, Beyoncé performed "XO" during the remaining stops of the North American leg of The Mrs. Carter Show World Tour in December 2013. In early 2014, she performed "Drunk in Love" for the first time at the 56th Annual Grammy Awards on January 26. "XO"'s first televised performance was at the 2014 BRIT Awards on February 19, marking her first performance at the ceremony since the one held in 2004. Later that month, songs from the album were added to the set list of the second European leg of The Mrs. Carter Show World Tour. All the music videos from the album were screened at the 2014 Los Angeles Film Festival on June 13 along with commentary from three of the videos' directors who were present at the ceremony. To further promote the album, Beyoncé embarked on her first co-headlining stadium tour with Jay-Z. The On the Run Tour kicked off in Miami on June 25, 2014, and ended in Paris on September 13, 2014. A pre-recorded performance of "Partition" from the tour was broadcast at the 2014 BET Awards on June 29. Beyoncé performed a sixteen-minute medley of the album's songs at the 2014 MTV Video Music Awards on August 24.

On December 12, 2014, just about one year after the release of Beyoncé, a short film entitled Yours and Mine was uploaded to Beyoncé's website and to YouTube. The entirely black and white spoken-word film, which features behind-the-scenes footage and repurposed imagery from the music videos of Beyoncé, was described as "a retrospective short film celebrating the one-year anniversary of the self-titled visual album".

Singles 
Two lead singles were released from Beyoncé. "XO" impacted contemporary hit radio in Italy and hot adult contemporary radio in the United States on December 16, 2013. The following day, it impacted urban contemporary, rhythmic contemporary and contemporary hit radio stations in the United States. "XO" peaked at number forty-five on the US Billboard Hot 100 and reached the top twenty in charts around the world.

Accompanying the release of "XO", the other lead single "Drunk in Love" was serviced to urban contemporary radio stations in the United States on December 17, 2013. It peaked at number two on the US Billboard Hot 100 and number one on the US Hot R&B/Hip-Hop Songs and Rhythmic charts. "Drunk in Love" also peaked at number seven in New Zealand and number nine in France and the United Kingdom. The song was certified platinum by the Recording Industry Association of America (RIAA), denoting sales of one million digital copies.

"Partition" impacted urban contemporary radio in the United States on February 25, 2014, as the album's third single. It peaked at number twenty-three on the US Billboard Hot 100 and number one on the US Dance Club Songs.

On April 24, 2014, the music video for the fourth single "Pretty Hurts" was made available for streaming via Time magazine's official website to accompany Beyoncé's feature as one of the world's most influential people. The song impacted contemporary hit and rhythmic radio in the United States on June 10, 2014 and contemporary hit radio in the United Kingdom on June 23, 2014.

"Flawless" was released as the fifth and final single from the album. Its remix, featuring Nicki Minaj, was released on August 12, 2014.

Critical reception 

Beyoncé received widespread acclaim from music critics. At Metacritic, which assigns a weighted mean rating out of 100 to reviews from mainstream publications, the album received a high score of 85, based on 34 reviews. Critics generally commended the album as thematically and musically bold, as well as emphasizing its visual aspect and surprise release; many said it was her magnum opus. Summarizing the album for Pitchfork, Jillian Mapes calls Beyoncé "MJ-level talent met pop-perfectionism in a moment that defined album-cycle disruption [and] a victory lap Bey took as pop feminism's reigning goddess".

The album's exploration of sexuality was particularly well received by reviewers. The New York Times chief critic Jon Pareles described the tracks as "steamy and sleek, full of erotic exploits and sultry vocals" noting that "every so often, for variety, they turn vulnerable, compassionate or pro-feminist". Caitlin White, writing for The 405, characterized Beyoncé as a feminist text. She noted that the tracks demonstrate Beyoncé's desire to retain complete sexual agency, while also forgoing the expectations of pop songcraft by placing female pleasure at the forefront unquestioningly. Robert Christgau admired the album's "sex sequence" of songs, where for "over seven well-differentiated tracks", Beyoncé "performs the unlikely feat of conveying an open-ended eroticism that varies because [she] knows eroticism does, for each of us in our individual responses as well as for her". PopMatters' David Amidon similarly praised the album's honest, highly sexual nature, observing it was "her first attempt at bridging an audience, making music that makes the men want to hear what she has to say and the women feel like they can say it to men as well".

Other reviews recognized that the album eschewed contemporary R&B in favor of more experimental compositions. Pitchfork writer Carrie Battan of the same publication wrote that Beyoncé was "exploring sounds and ideas at the grittier margins of popular music" and rejecting "traditional pop structures in favor of atmosphere". Spins Anupa Mistry felt it was "more textured than its predecessors in both sound and content", and applauded the singer's transition to a maturer sound of "big-hook message pop, multi-directional, mood-shifting suites and delicately resonant R&B ballads". Noting the lack of "guaranteed hits", NME believed that the "low-key, moody production throws the spotlight on the words and the images brought to play" and described it as her most experimental work to date. Rolling Stones pop critic Rob Sheffield found Beyoncés boldness among its best attributes, believing the album is at its "strongest when it goes for full-grown electro soul with an artsy boho edge". Mikael Wood of the Los Angeles Times highlighted a desire to push creative boundaries among the tracks and admired "how the music similarly blends the intimate and the extravagant", while Entertainment Weekly writer Nick Catucci concluded that the album was characterized by "clashing impulses—between strength and escape, megapop and fresh sounds, big messages and resonant lyrics".

Praise was also reserved for Beyoncé's vocal performance. The Telegraphs Neil McCormick declared Beyoncé as "one of the most technically gifted vocalists in pop" favoring her "gospel power, hip-hop flow and [huge] range". He was particularly complimentary of the vocal restraint displayed across the tracks that was absent from previous releases. Kitty Empire of The Observer noted the diverseness of her vocals on the album's up-tempo songs and found the singer ranging between "squeaky sexed-up falsettos, hood rat rapping, wordless ecstasies and effortless swoops". Clash regarded her voice most effective on the album's ballads, where they commented on how diversely her vocals conveyed feelings of love and described her "power and control [as] breathtaking".

Accolades 
Despite being released in December when several publications had completed their year-end lists, Beyoncé was ranked the best album of the year by Billboard, Houston Chronicle and Los Angeles Times, while Spin ranked it the best R&B album of the year. As of January 2015, Billboard also named Beyoncé as the second best album of the first half of the 2010s. The album was ranked within the top ten on lists by Associated Press, HitFix, MTV News, Club Fonograma and Digital Spy. Beyoncé was ranked at number eleven on Metacritic's twenty-five best-reviewed albums of 2013. On the annual Pazz and Jop mass critics poll of the year's best in music, the album was ranked at number four. Robert Christgau, the poll's creator, ranked it eighteenth on his own year-end list. Some publications included Beyoncé on their 2014 lists, and it was deemed the best album of the year by Vibe, Pretty Much Amazing and Nate Chinen of The New York Times. Consequence of Sound listed the effort as the eighteenth best one from 2014 and Tiny Mix Tapes, the fortieth one. Pitchfork named Beyoncé the fourteenth best album of the decade (2010–2014) so far; Fact listed the album as the ninth best one from the same period.

Beyoncé was included in best-of lists of the 2010s decade by several publications, including Pitchfork (3rd), The Associated Press (3rd), Stereogum (7th), Billboard (11th), Rolling Stone (26th), Consequence of Sound (79th), NME (55th), Uproxx (33rd), Tiny Mix Tapes (35th), Paste (40th) and Spex (57th).

Spin considered the album the thirty-eighth best one of the past thirty years (1985–2014) and Q named it one of the greatest albums of the past thirty years. On Rolling Stone's 500 Greatest Albums of All Time list, Beyoncé was placed at number 81, citing the album's "musical scope and feminist outreach" and adding that it "proved that nobody else was on her level". The Guardian included the project at number 9 on their ranking of the 100 best albums of the 21st century. Beyoncé was also included on the 2016 update of the 1001 Albums You Must Hear Before You Die. Consequence of Sound named the album the 37th best one of the last 15 years (2007–2022).

The album was nominated for five Grammy Awards at the 57th Annual Grammy Awards (2015), including Album of the Year, Best Urban Contemporary Album, Best Surround Sound Album and Best R&B Song and Best R&B Performance for "Drunk in Love", winning the latter three. In a recreation of an infamous incident at the 2009 MTV Video Music Awards, Kanye West briefly appeared on stage during the presentation of the Album of the Year award to Becks Morning Phase (2014) in protest of Beyoncé not winning. While it initially appeared to be a joke as West returned to his seat, he said in comments following the ceremony that Beck "needs to respect artistry and he should have given his award to Beyoncé". He later apologized for his comments.

At the 2014 MTV Video Music Awards, Beyoncé was presented with the Michael Jackson Video Vanguard Award for her work on the visual album, performing a sixteen-minute medley of its songs. Van Tofler, president and CEO of Viacom, noted that their choice for the Vanguard Award was influenced by this project, saying, "when [she] put out the record and the way she did it in such a visual way, she was the most obvious choice". She won a further three awards, Best Collaboration for "Drunk in Love", and Best Cinematography and Best Video with a Social Message for "Pretty Hurts". The album was nominated for World's Best Album at the 2014 World Music Awards and Album of the Year at the 2014 MTV Video Music Awards Japan. It also received two nominations at the 2014 Billboard Music Awards for Top Billboard 200 Album and Top R&B Album, while "Drunk in Love" was nominated for Top R&B Song. At the 2014 mtvU Woodie Awards, Beyoncé won in the category Did It My Way Woodie, awarded for the album's release strategy. It won in the category for Album of the Year at the 2014 Soul Train Music Awards and Favorite Soul/R&B Album at the American Music Awards of 2014.

Commercial performance 

During its first day of release in the United States, Beyoncé sold 80,000 units in three hours and a total of 430,000 digital copies within 24 hours. In its second day, the album sold 120,000 units, which brought its two-day sales total to 550,000. Billboard predicted it to sell around 600,000 digital copies by the end of the tracking week on December 15, 2013. Beyoncé debuted at number one on the Billboard 200, with three-day sales of 617,213 digital copies. This gave Beyoncé her fifth consecutive number-one album, making her the first female artist to have her first five studio albums debut atop the chart, beating Britney Spears' record of four in a row. It also became the largest debut sales week for a female artist in 2013, and the highest debut sales week of her solo career. The album also gave her the three largest sales weeks by any female and she became the only female to sell 300,000 copies within a week in 2013 and became the first person in the 2010s to score 300,000 copies in each of its first 3 weeks. Beyoncé marks the fourth-largest sales week of an album during 2013, behind Justin Timberlake's The 20/20 Experience, Eminem's The Marshall Mathers LP 2 and Drake's Nothing Was the Same.

In its second week, the album remained at number one, selling an additional 374,000 copies. Ten days after its release, Beyoncé had sold 991,000 copies in the US, making it the best-selling album by a female artist in 2013. A third week at number-one with sales of 310,000 copies brought the album's US sales to 1.3 million after 17 days of release, positioning it as the eighth-best-selling album of the year, and the first to enter the year-end top 10 based on just three weeks of sales availability in the Nielsen SoundScan era. In its fourth week, sales reached 1.43 million, surpassing the total sales of Beyoncé's previous album, 4, which was released in 2011 and had sold 1.39 million in total in the two years since its release. Following Beyoncé performing at the 2014 MTV Video Music Awards, sales of the album in the US increased by 181%. The record sold 878,000 copies in the US in 2014 alone, becoming the sixth-best-selling album of the year. As of August 2022, Beyoncé has been certified five-times platinum by the Recording Industry Association of America (RIAA) for the sale of five million units, and all fourteen tracks are certified gold or higher for the sale of 500,000 units, making it the fourth female album in history to have all its tracks RIAA certified.

On December 16, Apple Inc. announced that Beyoncé was the fastest selling album in the history of the iTunes Store, both in the United States and worldwide. It sold 828,773 digital copies worldwide in its first three days, and topped the iTunes Store charts in one-hundred-and-four countries. Six days after its release, Beyoncé had sold one million digital copies on iTunes Stores worldwide. Beyoncé debuted at number five on the UK Albums Chart on December 15, with two-day sales of 67,858 digital copies. The Official Charts Company's chief executive Martin Talbot noted that "few (if any) albums have sold as many digital copies in such a short space of time." In its fifth week, the album climbed to a new peak of number two. It was certified platinum by the British Phonographic Industry (BPI) on February 7, 2014, denoting shipments of 300,000 copies. As of April 2016, Beyoncé has sold 505,000 copies in the United Kingdom. On August 3, 2018, Beyoncé was certified double platinum by the BPI, denoting shipments of 600,000.

The album entered the Canadian Albums Chart at number one, with 35,000 digital copies sold. It debuted at number twenty-four on the French Albums Chart with two-days sales of 12,100 digital copies, and peaked at number thirteen in its fifth week. The album debuted atop the Dutch Albums Chart, giving Beyoncé her first number-one album in the Netherlands. In Australia, Beyoncé entered the ARIA Albums Chart at number two, with first-week sales of 31,102 digital copies. The album topped the chart in its third week, becoming Beyoncé's first number-one album in Australia. It spent three consecutive weeks at number one and was certified platinum by the Australian Recording Industry Association (ARIA) for shipping 70,000 copies. In New Zealand, Beyoncé debuted at number two and was certified gold by Recorded Music NZ (RMNZ) for sales of 7,500 copies; it was later certified platinum. According to the International Federation of the Phonographic Industry (IFPI), within the last nineteen days of 2013, the album sold 2.3 million units worldwide, becoming the tenth-best-selling album of 2013. The album also went on to become the 20th-best-selling album of 2014. Worldwide, Beyoncé sold more thn five million copies as of November 2016 and has generated over 1 billion streams as of March 2015.

In 2014, Beyoncé was ranked as the second-most popular album of the year on the Billboard 200 only behind Disney's Frozen soundtrack.

Legacy 
According to Billboard, as of 2022, Beyoncé is one of the 15 best-performing 21st-century albums without any of its singles being number-one hits on the Billboard Hot 100. The surprising release of Beyoncé caused "hilarious, honest and hysterical" reaction among Beyoncé's fans, and "shock" among other musicians in an effect coined as "Beyoncé Syndrome" by the BBC. According to data provided by Twitter, the release generated over 1.2 million tweets in twelve hours.

Rolling Stones Rob Sheffield wrote: "The whole project is a celebration of the Beyoncé Philosophy, which boils down to the fact that Beyoncé can do anything the hell she wants to." Peter Robinson of The Guardian hailed the shock release as "Beyoncégeddon", describing it as "a masterclass in both exerting and relinquishing control". Henry Knight for the BBC said "Beyoncé's self-titled album not only proved innovative musically, it rewrote the business model of the industry." Forbes Zack O'Malley Greenburg included Beyoncé on his "Music Industry Winners 2013" list, noting that the singer "didn't make use of any of the perks of [being signed to a large record label]—the "machine" we're told is so necessary. There was no radio promotion, no single, no advance press of any kind". The marketing strategy of releasing an album with little or no notice was the subject of a case study at Harvard University School of Business. Beyoncé is credited with the popularization of the surprise album, and the act of releasing a project without prior announcement has subsequently been executed by many artists, including Drake, Kanye West, Kendrick Lamar, and Eminem. Canadian musician Grimes named Beyoncé as one of the albums that changed her life, saying that it "revitalized the art of the album" for her".

After the International Federation of the Phonographic Industry (IFPI) announced Friday as the global record release day, Billboards Andrew Flanagan thought the album release was among the influencing points in the decision, writing: "After seven months of semi-public back-and-forth, a conversation instigated in part by Aussie piracy and Beyonce's surprise release in December 2013 has resulted in the global recording industry accepting Friday as the release date for new albums." Time named Beyoncé as one of the most influential people of 2014 due to the album release, writing: "In December, she took the world by surprise when she released a new album, complete with videos, and announced it on Facebook and Instagram. Beyoncé shattered music-industry rules – and sales records".

Track listing 
Credits adapted from the liner notes of Beyoncé.

Notes
  signifies a co-producer
  signifies an additional producer
 All tracks vocals produced by Beyoncé Knowles
 "Haunted" contains two parts – "Ghost" and "Haunted". Though presented as one song on audio, it is split into two separate videos.
 "No Angel" is stylized as "Angel" on the back of CD editions.
 "Partition" contains two parts – "Yoncé" and "Partition". Though presented as one song on audio, it is split into two separate videos.
 "Flawless" is stylized as "***Flawless"
 "Flawless" contains two parts – "Bow Down" and "Flawless", which are presented as one song, and one video. "Bow Down" was initially part of a previously recorded song entitled "Bow Down/I Been On".
 "Grown Woman" is presented after the credits on DVD while it is presented before the credits in digital format.
 "Grown Woman" is written by Mosley, Kelly Sheehan, Knowles, Nash, Chris Godbey, Harmon, Darryl Pearson, and Garland Mosley. It is produced by Timbaland, with co-production by Harmon.

Sample credits
 "Partition" contains an interpolation of the French-dubbed version of the 1998 film The Big Lebowski, performed by Hajiba Fahmy.
 "Flawless" contains portions of the speech "We should all be feminists", written and delivered by Chimamanda Ngozi Adichie.
 "Heaven" contains portions of "The Lord's Prayer" in Spanish, performed by Melissa Vargas.

Personnel 
Credits adapted from Beyoncé's official website.

Performers and musicians

 Beyoncé – lead vocals, background vocals
 Jay-Z – lead vocals 
 Drake – vocals 
 Chimamanda Ngozi Adichie – spoken word voices 
 Frank Ocean – lead vocals 
 Blue Ivy Carter – additional vocals 
 Boots – background vocals , piano , drums , guitar , keyboards 
 Pharrell Williams – background vocals 
 Timbaland – background vocals 
 Justin Timberlake – background vocals 
 Terius "The Dream" Nash – background vocals , additional piano 
 Ryan Tedder – background vocals 
 Kelly Rowland – background vocals 
 Michelle Williams – background vocals 
 Sampha – additional vocals 
 Sia – background vocals 
 Stefan Skarbek – background vocals 
 Kwane Wyatt – additional background vocals 
 Hajiba Fahmy – spoken word voices performed by 
 Melissa Vargas – "The Lord's Prayer" reciting 
 Katty Rodriguez – horns 
 Adison Evans – horns 
 Crystal Torres – horns 
 Mike Scott – guitar 
 Dwayne Wright – bass 
 Margot – violin played by, violin arrangement 
 Steven Wolf – live drums 

Technical

 Beyoncé – executive production, music production , vocal production
 Ammo – music production 
 Boots – music production , additional production , recording , instruments , additional arranging 
 Noel "Detail" Fisher – music production 
 Pharrell Williams – production 
 Caroline Polachek – music production , recording , synths and drum machine 
 Timbaland – music production , additional production , co-production 
 Jerome Harmon – music production , additional production , co-production 
 Justin Timberlake – music production , background vocals 
 Key Wane – music production , intro keys and intro music programming 
 Noah "40" Shebib – music production , recording 
 Terius "The Dream" Nash – music production 
 Ryan Tedder – music production , recording , music programming and other instruments 
 Hit-Boy – music production , additional music production , additional drum machine 
 Rey Reel – co-production 
 Brian Soko – additional production 
 Mike Dean – additional music production 
 Andre Proctor – additional music production 
 Majid Jordan – additional music production 
 Sidney "Omen" Brown – additional music production , additional drum machine 
 Stuart White – recording , mixing , digital editing and musical arrangement , additional mixing , mix engineering 
 Chris Godbey – recording , mixing 
 Bart Schoudel – recording 
 Andrew Coleman – recording , digital editing and musical arrangement 
 Ann Mincieli – recording 
 Noel Cadastre – recording 
 Jordan "DJ Swivel" Young – recording 
 James Krausse – recording , mix engineering , assistant mix engineering , assistant engineering , mastering 
 Mike Larson – recording 
 Elliot Scheiner – Surround sound mix (all tracks)
 Rob Cohen – recording 
 Jonathan Lee – recording 
 Ramon Rivas – second engineering , assistant engineering 
 Rob Suchecki – second engineering 
 Hajiba Fahmy – spoken word voice recording 
 Derek Dixie – additional synth sounds , additional SFX , mix consultation , horn arrangements 
 Niles Hollowell-Dhar – additional synth sounds 
 Tony Maserati – mixing 
 Andrew Scheps – mixing 
 Noel "Gadget" Campbell – mixing 
 Justin Hergett – mix engineering  assistant mix engineering , assistant engineering 
 Tyler Scott – assistant mix engineering , assistant engineering 
 Matt Weber – assistant engineering 
 Jon Castelli – assistant engineering 
 Christian Humphreys – assistant engineering 
 Paul Pavao – assistant mix engineering 
 Edward Valldejuli – assistant mix engineering 
 Chris Tabron – mix engineering , assistant mix engineering 
 Matt Wiggers – assistant mix engineering 
 Chris Cannon – assistant mix engineering 
 Carlos Perezdeanda – second engineering assistant 
 Tom Coyne – mastering 
 Aya Merrill – mastering

Charts

Weekly charts

Year-end charts

Decade-end charts

All-time charts

Certifications and sales

Release history

See also 
 Album era
 Beyoncé: Platinum Edition
 List of Billboard 200 number-one albums of 2013
 List of Billboard 200 number-one albums of 2014
 List of Billboard number-one R&B albums of 2013
 List of Billboard number-one R&B albums of 2014
 List of number-one albums of 2013 (Canada)
 List of number-one albums of 2014 (Canada)
 List of number-one albums of 2014 (Australia)
 List of UK R&B Chart number-one albums of 2013
 List of UK R&B Chart number-one albums of 2014

Notes

References

External links 
Official website

2013 albums
Albums produced by Hit-Boy
Albums produced by Jerome "J-Roc" Harmon
Albums produced by Justin Timberlake
Albums produced by Key Wane
Albums produced by Noah "40" Shebib
Albums produced by Detail (record producer)
Albums produced by Patrick Wimberly
Albums produced by Pharrell Williams
Albums produced by Ryan Tedder
Albums produced by Timbaland
Beyoncé albums
Columbia Records albums
Articles containing video clips
Albums produced by Beyoncé
Surprise albums
Albums produced by Caroline Polachek
Alternative R&B albums
Grammy Award for Best Immersive Audio Album
Visual albums